The 1977 Preakness Stakes was the 102nd running of the $200,000 Grade 1 Preakness Stakes thoroughbred horse race. The race took place on May 21, 1977, and was televised in the United States on ABC. Seattle Slew, who was jockeyed by Jean Cruguet, won the race by one and one half lengths over runner-up Iron Constitution. Approximate post time was 5:41 p.m. Eastern Time. The race was run on a fast track in a final time of 1:54-2/5.  The Maryland Jockey Club reported total attendance of 77,346, this is recorded as second highest on the list of American thoroughbred racing top attended events for North America in 1977.

Payout 

The 102nd Preakness Stakes Payout Schedule

$2 Exacta:  (8–7) paid   $42.20

The full chart 

 Winning Breeder: Ben S. Castleman; (KY)
 Winning Time: 1:54 2/5
 Track Condition: Fast
 Total Attendance: 77,346

See also
1977 Kentucky Derby
1977 Belmont Stakes

References

External links 

 

1977
1977 in horse racing
Horse races in Maryland
1977 in American sports
1977 in sports in Maryland